Old Junee is a village community in the central east part of the Riverina and situated about 8 kilometres north west from Junee and 16 kilometres east from Marrar. It was originally known as "Jewnee"

Jewnee Post Office opened on 1 May 1862 and was renamed Old Junee in 1885 when the present town of Junee was given the name.

The school at Old Junee was opened in 1880 and conducted in the old Methodist Church building under the name "Provisional School, Jewnee". A short time later Junee Junction, five miles distant, sprang up and so the name of this school and the village was, in 1885, changed from Jewnee to Old Junee. The school at Junee Junction is now known as Junee School.

Mr Harry D. Balmain was the first teacher and the oldest record at the school dates from 14 May 1880. For the portion of the quarter ending June, 1880, the total enrolment was 39 (20 boys, 19 girls), the average being 22.3. An amount of £2/8/0 was received in fees, there being no "gratuitous" scholars. The return was signed by Mr Samuel Storey as a member of the school board. Mr Storey officially opened the first school in 1880, a second building attached to the residence in 1882, and on Empire Day, 1913, the new, commodious building of two large rooms.

In 1894 Mr W. H. Bullen was the Teacher-in-Charge and remained there until 1912 when Mr. W. E. Cook was appointed. Mr Bullen had leave of absence for 3 months in 1902 after 20 years' service and was relieved by Messrs Hallman and Dawson for that period.
In 1895 an urgent application was made for fencing to provide for four horses - no doubt for the use of children arriving at school by horse and also in that year the school acquired  for the school paddock.

In 1899 an application was made for the use of the playground for a Moonlight Concert in aid of the Cricket Cub - evidence of the importance of the little country school in the community.

Additions were made to the school buildings from time to time. In 1901 additions in the form of bathroom and pantry for the residence, again in 1907 and 1911 a new bell post was required and finally in 1913 a new school was provided as mentioned earlier when Mr Cook was Headmaster with Miss Catherine Sly as assistant and the enrolment was 75 pupils. An additional area of 1 acre for playground purposes had been surveyed but as yet not dedicated.

From an enrolment of 75 in 1913, it rose to nearly 90 by 1914.
In 1916 the Roll of Honour was unveiled at the Old Junee School, and in 1921 application was again made to use the school as a meeting place for a social club.

In 1928 the Assistant Teacher, Mr L. Goodwin, on 17 February, was unable to report for duty owing to a washaway on the railway line. A heavy rain event throughout the district at this time flooded the town of Junee causing washaways. Many of the business houses were flooded and major railway line damage occurred.

In 1929, when school opened, there was no water available so an application had to be made to buy and transport water from the railway station. During the early thirties enrolment had dropped considerably and difficulties were experienced in keeping an assistant teacher and at one stage in 1935 (5 March 1935, there was no teacher at all). In that year 30 children competed in the P.S.A.A.A. sports.

Improvements to the school continued: In 1927 the school accepted a gift of 100 volumes of suitable literature from Mr & Mrs G. LeGay Brereton. In 1938 fly screens were supplied for the school and the parents fenced the school - all catering to the varied needs of the children. In 1938, also, Mr L. W. Storey donated a piece of land -  to the school. The school closed in 1966.

Staff: 1880, Mr Harry Balmain; 1893, W. H. Bullen; (1911, Assistant Miss Janet Butt); 1912, Mr W. E. Cook (assistant Miss Catherine Sly); (1915, assistant Miss F. M. Murphy); (1917, assistant Miss Nina Jones); (1919, assistant Miss Elizabeth Heritage); 1920, S. A. Latham; 1922, Alex Jennings (assistant Miss S. Mulhearne); (1924, assistant Mrs Mary Allan); (1926, assistant Miss Adelaide Stenning); (1928, assistant L. Goodwin); (1932, assistant Miss Sheila Paton); 1935, Henry Forge (assistant Mr Norman Gibbs); 1936, Peter Thompson (assistant Miss Eveleen McGowan; 1937, J. A. Heiss; 1941, Robert Lampard; Bill Mulrooney; Val Kesby (assistant Miss Patricia Phillipps); Doug Gamble; Ken Fletcher; Warren Dunnicliff.

References

Towns in the Riverina
Towns in New South Wales
Junee Shire